Tuyembetovo (Tuyömbät) is a rural locality (a village) in Maxyutovsky Selsoviet, Kugarchinsky District, Bashkortostan, Russia. The population was 140 as of 2010. There are 3 streets.

Geography 
Tuyembetovo is located 48 km south of Mrakovo (the district's administrative centre) by road. Aygay-Mursalyay is the nearest rural locality.

References 

Rural localities in Kugarchinsky District